Frank X. Barron (June 17, 1922 – October 6, 2002) was an American psychologist and philosopher. He is considered a pioneer in the psychology of creativity and in the study of human personality.

Barron was born in Lansford, Pennsylvania He received Ph.D. at University of California, Berkeley in 1950 and worked for over 30 years at the Berkeley Institute for Personality Assessment and Research. Barron was one of the first contemporary psychologists to study effects of psychedelic drugs. In 1960 he was a co-founder of the Harvard Psychedelic Drug Research.

Barron received the APA Richardson Creativity Award in 1969 and the Rudolf Arnheim Award in 1995.

Major works 
 Barron, F. The Psychology of Imagination. – "Scientific American", CXCIX, September, 1958.
 Barron, F. X. (1963). Creativity and Psychological Health. Princeton: Van Nostrand.
 Barron, F. X. (1963). Scientific Creativity. New York: John Wiley and Sons.
 Barron, F. X. (1965) The Creative Process and the Psychedelic Experience. Explorations magazine, Berkeley California, June–July.
 Barron, F. X. (1968). Creativity and Personal Freedom. New York: Van Nostrand.
 Barron, F. X. (1969). Creative Person, Creative Process. New York: Holt, Rinehart & Winston.
 Barron, F. X. (1972). Artists in the Making. New York: Seminar Press,
 Barron, F. X. (1979).The Shaping of Personality. New York: Harper & Row.
 Barron, F. X. (1995). No Rootless Flower. An Ecology of Creativity. Cresskill, NJ: Hampton.
 Barron, F. X., Montuori, A., Barron, A. (1997). Creators on Creating. New York, N.Y.: Tarcher Penguin.

References

External links
 F. X. Barron, 80; Studied Science of Creativity, The New York Times.
 Frank Barron, 80; UC Scholar, Author Explored Psychology of Creative Mind, Los Angeles Times  
 Frank X. Barron Archives at the Cummings Center for the History of Psychology at the University of Akron, Akron, Ohio.

1922 births
2002 deaths
American male non-fiction writers
American psychology writers
Psychedelic drug researchers
20th-century American psychologists
UC Berkeley College of Letters and Science alumni
20th-century American male writers
American psychologists